Naouri is a surname. Notable people with the surname include:
 Gabriel Naouri, French businessman
 Jean-Charles Naouri (born 1949), French businessman
 Jean-Yves Naouri (born 1959), French businessman
 Laurent Naouri (born 1964), French bass-baritone
 Rahamim Naouri (1902-1985), French-Algerian rabbi